Isoko Development Union is an Isoko socio-cultural organization in Nigeria. The group aims to represent the interests of all Isoko communities within and outside Nigeria. It is referred to as the “apex socio-cultural organization of the Isoko ethnic nationality”.

History
The social-cultural group which started in 1943 was first inaugurated as Isoko State Union which later changed to Isoko Development Union. It was inaugurated with the aim of enhancing and facilitating the coexistence of Isoko communities at mutual advantage.

See also
Isoko people
Isoko region
Isoko language

References

1943 establishments
1943 in Nigeria